Michael "Mikey" Jennings (born 9 September 1977) is a British former professional boxer who competed from 1999 to 2010. He challenged once for the vacant WBO welterweight title in 2009. At regional level, he held the British welterweight title from 2005 to 2006. He has 2 sons, Mikey and Jack, and a daughter, Macy.

Professional career
Jennings turned with a 1st-round knockout of Tony Smith. Jennings in his early fights, with victories over journeyman fighters such as Lee Molyneux, Brian Coleman and Paul Denton. In May, 2003, Jennings won his first title when he defeated Jimmy Gould for the minor WBU International welterweight title. On 1 October 2004, he won the English welterweight championship with a 5th round stoppage of Chris Saunders.

British Title

In July 2005, he won the vacant British welterweight title with a 1st-round knockout of Jimmy Vincent. On 25 October 2005, Jennings recovered from a 1st round knockdown to go on to defeat Bradley Pryce on points in a defence of his British title. In January 2006, Jennings lost the title via a close split decision defeat to Young Mutley in his second title defence. Following the defeat to Mutley, Jennings returned to the ring in September 2006 to knockout Slovakian Rastislav Kovac in 3 rounds.

WBU title
On 7 April 2007, Jennings defeated Mehrdud Takaloo via a unanimous points decision to win the WBU welterweight title. The fight was held at the Millennium Stadium, Cardiff on the undercard of Joe Calzaghe's fight with Peter Manfredo Jr. On 2 February 2008, Jennings stopped Ross Minter, son of former World champion Alan Minter, in the 9th of a 12-round contest round en route to defending his WBU title.

Vs Miguel Cotto
On 21 February 2009 Jennings was defeated via 5th-round TKO by the now retired five-time, 3 weight world champion Miguel Cotto for the vacant WBO Welterweight Title in New York's, Madison Square Garden.

Championships Held
 British Weltwerweight title
 English Welterweight title
 WBU International Welterweight title

Notable Bouts

See also
 List of British welterweight boxing champions

External links
 
 Jennings official website

References

 
 
 
 

1977 births
Living people
English male boxers
Sportspeople from Chorley
Welterweight boxers